Robert James Cook (born 11 October 1932) is a Bermudian former swimmer. He competed at the 1948 Summer Olympics and the 1952 Summer Olympics.

References

1932 births
Living people
Bermudian male swimmers
Olympic swimmers of Bermuda
Swimmers at the 1948 Summer Olympics
Swimmers at the 1952 Summer Olympics
Place of birth missing (living people)